Vespertilionini is a tribe of bats in the family Vespertilionidae. The largest of the tribes in Vespertilioninae, it contains many genera found throughout the Old World and Australasia.

Species 
Species in the tribe include:

 Genus Afronycteris
 Heller's serotine, Afronycteris helios
 Banana serotine, Afronycteris nanus
 Genus Cassistrellus – helmeted bats
 Surat helmeted bat, Cassistrellus dimissus
 Yok Don helmeted bat, Cassistrellus yokdonensis
 Genus Chalinolobus – wattled bats
 Large-eared pied bat, Chalinolobus dwyeri
 Gould's wattled bat, Chalinolobus gouldii
 Chocolate wattled bat, Chalinolobus morio
 New Caledonian wattled bat, Chalinolobus neocaledonicus
 Hoary wattled bat, Chalinolobus nigrogriseus
 Little pied bat, Chalinolobus picatus
 New Zealand long-tailed bat or long-tailed wattled bat, Chalinolobus tuberculatus
 Genus Falsistrellus – false pipistrelles
 Western false pipistrelle, Falsistrellus mackenziei
 Eastern false pipistrelle, Falsistrellus tasmaniensis
 Genus Hypsugo – Asian pipistrelles
 Chocolate pipistrelle, Hypsugo affinis
 Alashanian pipistrelle, Hypsugo alaschanicus
 Arabian pipistrelle, Hypsugo arabicus
 Desert pipistrelle, Hypsugo ariel
 Bodenheimer's pipistrelle, Hypsugo bodenheimeri
 Cadorna's pipistrelle, Hypsugo cadornae
 Long-toothed pipistrelle, Hypsugo dolichodon
 Brown pipistrelle, Hypsugo imbricatus
 Red-brown pipistrelle, Hypsugo kitcheneri
 Socotran pipistrelle or Lanza's pipistrelle, Hypsugo lanzai
 Burma pipistrelle, Hypsugo lophurus
 Big-eared pipistrelle, Hypsugo macrotis
 Pungent pipistrelle, Hypsugo mordax
 Mouselike pipistrelle, Hypsugo musciculus
 Peters's pipistrelle, Hypsugo petersi
 Chinese pipistrelle, Hypsugo pulveratus
 Savi's pipistrelle, Hypsugo savii
 Vordermann's pipistrelle, Hypsugo vordermanni
 Genus Laephotis – long-eared bats
 Angolan long-eared bat, Laephotis angolensis
 Botswanan long-eared bat, Laephotis botswanae
 Cape serotine, Laeophotis capensis
 East African serotine, Laephotis kirinyaga
 Isalo serotine, Laephotis malagasyensis
 Malagasy serotine, Laephotis matroka
 Namib long-eared bat, Laephotis namibensis
 Roberts's serotine, Laephotis robertsi
 Stanley's serotine, Laephotis stanleyi
 De Winton's long-eared bat, Laephotis wintoni
 Genus Mimetillus
 Moloney's mimic bat, Mimetillus moloneyi
 Thomas's mimic bat, Mimetillus thomasi
 Genus Mirostrellus
 Joffre's bat, Mirostrellus joffrei
 Genus Neoromicia
 Anchieta's serotine, Neoromicia anchietae
 Kirindy serotine, Neoromicia bemainty
 Yellow serotine, Neoromicia flavescens
 Tiny serotine, Neoromicia guineensis
 Melck's house bat, Neoromicia melckorum
 Somali serotine, Neoromicia somalica
 Zulu serotine, Neoromicia zuluensis
 Genus Nycticeinops
 Bellier's serotine, Nycticeinops bellieri
 Broad-headed serotine, Nycticeinops crassulus
 Eisentraut's serotine, Nycticeinops eisentrauti
 Grandidier's serotine, Nycticeinops grandidieri
 Happolds's serotine, Nycticeinops happoldorum
 Large-headed serotine, Nycticeinops macrocephalus
 Schlieffen's serotine, Nycticeinops schlieffeni
 Genus Nyctophilus – New Guinean and Australian big-eared bats
 Northern long-eared bat, Nyctophilus arnhemensis
 Eastern long-eared bat, Nyctophilus bifax
 South-eastern long-eared bat, Nyctophilus corbeni
 Pallid long-eared bat, Nyctophilus daedalus
 Lesser long-eared bat, Nyctophilus geoffroyi
 Gould's long-eared bat, Nyctophilus gouldi
 Sunda long-eared bat, Nyctophilus heran
 †Lord Howe long-eared bat, Nyctophilus howensis
 Holt's long-eared bat, Nyctophilus holtorum
 Small-toothed long-eared bat, Nyctophilus microdon
 New Guinea long-eared bat, Nyctophilus microtis
 New Caledonian long-eared bat, Nyctophilus nebulosus
 Greater long-eared bat, Nyctophilus timoriensis
 Western long-eared bat, Nyctophilus major
 Tasmanian long-eared bat, Nyctophilus sherrini
 Mt. Missim long-eared bat, Nyctophilus shirleyae
 Pygmy long-eared bat, Nyctophilus walkeri
 Genus Pharotis
 New Guinea big-eared bat, Pharotis imogene
 Genus Philetor
 Rohu's bat, Philetor brachypterus
 Genus Pseudoromicia
 Dark-brown serotine, Pseudoromicia brunnea
 Isabelline serotine, Pseudoromicia isabella
 Kityo's serotine, Pseudoromicia kityoi
 Nyanza serotine, Pseudoromicia nyanza
 Rendall's serotine, Pseudoromicia rendalli
 Rosevear's serotine, Pseudoromicia roseveari
 White-winged serotine, Pseudoromicia tenuipinnis
 Genus Tylonycteris – bamboo bats
 Amber bamboo bat, Tylonycteris fulvida
 Malayan bamboo bat, Tylonycteris malayana
 Lesser bamboo bat, Tylonycteris pachypus
 Pygmy bamboo bat, Tylonycteris pygmaeus
 Greater bamboo bat, Tylonycteris robustula
 Tonkin bamboo bat, Tylonycteris tonkinensis
 Genus Vespadelus
 Inland forest bat, Vespadelus baverstocki
 Northern cave bat, Vespadelus caurinus
 Large forest bat, Vespadelus darlingtoni
 Yellow-lipped bat, Vespadelus douglasorum
 Finlayson's cave bat, Vespadelus finlaysoni
 Eastern forest bat, Vespadelus pumilus
 Southern forest bat, Vespadelus regulus
 Troughton's forest bat, Vespadelus troughtoni
 Little forest bat, Vespadelus vulturnus
 Genus Vespertilio – frosted bats
 Parti-coloured bat, Vespertilio murinus
 Asian parti-colored bat, Vespertilio sinensis

References 

Mammal tribes
Vesper bats
Taxa named by John Edward Gray